Pelland may refer to:

Pelland Engineering, British kit car manufacturing company
Pelland, Minnesota, unincorporated community

People with the surname
Paul Pelland, long-distance motorcyclist